The Biotech Fund Flanders (Dutch: Biotech Fonds Vlaanderen) was founded by the Flemish government in 1994 as an instrument to support the creation of new companies, explicitly in biotechnology. It provides venture capital to biotech companies in Flanders (Belgium). The fund has 21.7 million euro of capital and is managed by the GIMV.

See also
 Flanders Interuniversity Institute of Biotechnology (VIB)
 Flanders Investment and Trade
 FlandersBio
 Institute for the promotion of Innovation by Science and Technology (IWT)
 Participatiemaatschappij Vlaanderen (PMV)
 Science and technology in Flanders
 Venture capital

References

 Biotech Fonds Vlaanderen (Dutch)
 Vlaamse Regering in kort bestek - 20 mei 2005 (Dutch)
 Biotech Fonds Vlaanderen na tien jaar verlengd (Dutch)

External links
 GIMV

Financial services companies established in 1994
Investment companies of the Netherlands
Flemish government departments and agencies